The Seven Stars is a Grade II listed public house at 53-54 Carey Street, Holborn, London. It is unusual for having survived the Great Fire of London.

It probably originated in the 17th century, and it is dated 1602, and was formerly known as The Log and Seven Stars.

Whilst the frontage may bear the date 1602, the building itself is likely to date from the 1680s. 

The interior served as a filming location for a scene in the movie All the Old Knives.

See also 
 List of buildings that survived the Great Fire of London
 List of pubs in London

References

Buildings and structures in the London Borough of Camden
Grade II listed pubs in London
Buildings and structures in Holborn
17th-century architecture in the United Kingdom